Katastrofa is a 1965 Polish drama film directed by Sylwester Chęciński.

Cast
 Marta Lipińska as Hanka
 Stanisław Niwiński as Grzegorz Hulewicz
 Aleksander Fogiel as Straw boss Bien
 Wiktor Grotowicz as Director Rozner
 Witold Pyrkosz as Inspector Witold Roszak
 Edmund Fetting as Rowicki
 Zbigniew Dobrzyński as Tomasz
 Zdzisław Maklakiewicz as Kotarski
 Antonina Girycz as Ewa
 Janusz Klosinski as Nowak
 Eliasz Kuziemski as Bien's lawyer
 Zofia Merle as Draughtswoman Zosia
 Leon Niemczyk as Prosecutor

References

External links
 

1965 films
1965 drama films
Polish drama films
1960s Polish-language films